Delhi Transco Limited (DTL), formerly Delhi Power Supply Company Limited (DPSCL) is the State Transmission Utility for the National Capital Territory of Delhi. It is responsible for the transmission of power at 220 kV and 400 kV level and for upgrading, operating and maintaining the high voltage network.

History of Electricity in Delhi

The position is that as per available records, the first diesel Power Station was established in Delhi in the year 1905 when a private English Company by name M/s.  John Fleming was given permission to generate electricity under the provisions of the Indian Electricity Act 1903.  The above-mentioned Company was given the responsibility both of generation and distribution of power in a limited manner.  That Company after obtaining license under the provisions of Electricity Act 1903 had set up a small 2 MW Diesel set at Lahori Gate in Old Delhi.  Later on, this very Company was converted as Delhi Electricity Supply and Traction Company.   In the Year 1911, the power generation was augmented by Steam Generation Station.  In the year 1932, the management of Central Power House was handed over to New Delhi Municipal Committee (NDMC).  In the field of power generation and distribution, a major break through was achieved in 1939 when Delhi Central Electricity Power Authority (DCEPA) was established.  This Company was responsible for the supply of power to the areas covered by Local Bodies, namely, the Municipal Committees of Delhi, West Delhi and South Delhi, the Notified Area Committees of Red Fort,  Civil Lines, Mehrauli, Najafgarh, and the District Board of Delhi.  The supply of electricity to the Municipal Committees of Delhi-Shahdara and the Notified Area of Narela was done by different private agencies.  In 1947 DCEPA took over a Private Limited Company by name Delhi electric Supply & traction Company Limited.

Formation of Delhi State Electricity Board (DSEB) 
In the year 1951 the Delhi State Electricity Board (DSEB) came into existence and the responsibility of generation and distribution of electricity was taken over by DSEB from DCEPA.

Formation of Delhi Electric Supply Undertaking (DESU)
After the promulgation of the Delhi Municipal Corporation Act 1957, the DSEB was dissolved and the functions of DSEB were taken over by Delhi Electric Supply Undertaking (DESU), which came into existence in 1958.  After the formation DESU, the generation and distribution of electricity to all the areas of Delhi came under DESU.

Formation of Delhi Vidyut Board (DVB)
The Government of the National Capital Territory of Delhi vide notification No.  F.11 (10)/92-LSG /PF (II) dated 24.02.1997, issued under the Electricity (Supply) Act, 1948, constituted a separate Electricity Board, i.e. the Delhi Vidyut Board (DVB) for the NCT of Delhi w.e.f. 24.02.1997 for the purpose of generation and distribution of power to the entire area of NCT of Delhi except the areas falling within the jurisdiction of NDMC and Delhi Cantonment Board.

Unbundling of Delhi Vidyut Board (DVB)
The power situation in Delhi till a few years ago was yet another example of man's incapacity to handle another form of energy. The Delhi Vidyut Board (DVB) was a State Electricity Board set up in 1997 under the Electricity (Supply) Act, 1948, succeeding the Delhi Electricity Supply Undertaking (DESU) which has existed since 1957 as a wing of the Municipal Corporation of Delhi. It was an integrated utility with the generation, transmission, and distribution functions serving all of Delhi except the NDMC and MES (Cantonment) areas to which it supplied power in bulk.

The creation of DVB, replacing DESU, in 1997 proved to be merely a change in the legal status of the organization and was not followed by any real change in its structure, functioning, and work culture. Its reputation continued to deteriorate and its poor commercial performance, the best-known thing about DVB perhaps being its high Transmission and Distribution (T&D) losses made it a drain on the public exchequer. Further, failure in raising the resources necessary for the improvement of its services made matters critical. There were unprecedented, widespread expressions of public discontent during the difficult summer of 1998.

In December 1998 when the Government came to power in Delhi, the power situation was grim. With T & D losses as high as 50% regular power cut for 10 to 15 hours and Delhi Vidyut Board accumulating liabilities of over Rs. 23,000 crores, Delhi Government had to come up with a fast and viable alternative. An alternative that would not only meet people's aspirations in terms of its end result but also be interesting enough for investors. And thus began a step by step process of a never-before fundamental power reform.

Delhi Electricity Board Regulatory Commission (DERC) was constituted in May 1999 whose prime responsibility was to look into the entire gamut of existing activity and search for various ways of power sector reforms. The DERC is even today a fully functional body that has since issued tariff orders for annual revenue requirements.
Delhi Electricity Reform Ordinance, 2000 was a body that was promulgated in October 2000 and notified in the form of an Act in March 2001. It mainly provides for the constitution of an Electricity Regulatory Commission, unbundling of DVB into separate generation, transmission, and distribution companies, and increasing avenues for the participation of the private sector.

This was followed by a Tripartite Agreement which was signed by the Government of Delhi, DVB employees to ensure the cooperation of stakeholders in this reform process. The tripartite agreement sent off very positive vibes to the people in general as well as to the investor community about the sincere and hassle-free objectives of power reforms.

Next, a two-stage competitive bidding process of Request for Qualification (RFQ) and Request for Proposal (RFP) was set into motion for the privatization of the distribution companies.

The bidders were selected on the basis of reduction of total Aggregate Technical and Commercial losses (AT & C) a unique feature of the power sector reforms in Delhi. The bidders were required to bid on the basis of efficiency improvement like the reduction of AT & C losses that they achieve year-wise over a period of five years.

Formation of Delhi Transco Limited (DTL)
On 1 July 2002,The Delhi Vidyut Board (DVB) was unbundled into six successor companies: Delhi Power Supply Company Limited (DPCL)- Holding Company; Delhi Transco Limited (DTL) – TRANSCO; Indraprastha Power Generation Company Limited (IPGCL) – GENCO; BSES Rajdhani Power Limited (BRPL) – DISCOM; BSES Yamuna Power Limited (BYPL) – DISCOM; North Delhi Power Limited (NDPL) – DISCOM.

The Government handed over the management of the business of electricity distribution to three private companies BRPL, BYPL and NDPL since 1 July 2002 with 51% equity with the private sector.(DVB itself was the successor entity to the Delhi Electricity Supply Undertaking (DESU).

Of these five companies, BRPL, BYPL and NDPL are joint ventures between the Delhi Government and the private sector which handle the power distribution sector in Delhi. BRPL is responsible for distribution of power in Central, South and West Delhi. BYPL handles power distribution in East Delhi (Trans-Yamuna). NDPL distributes power in North and North-West Delhi. The remaining two companies, DTL and IPGCL, are wholly owned by the Delhi Government. Delhi Transco Limited is a 'State Transmission Utility of the National Capital of Delhi', whereas IPGCL is responsible for power generation.

Over the years, DTL has evolved as a dynamic performer, keeping pace with the many challenges that confront the ever-increasing demand-supply-power-situation and achieving functional superiority on all fronts. The Transmission losses have been brought down from 3.84% in 2002–03 to 0.83% in 2006–07, and are the lowest in the country. Delhi, being the capital of India and the hub of commercial activities in the Northern Region, coupled with the prosperity of the population, the load requirement has been growing at a much faster pace. Added to that, being the focus of socio-economic and political life of India, Delhi is assuming increasing eminence among the great cities of the world. Plus the vision-2021, aiming to make Delhi a global Metropolitan and world class city demands greater infrastructure to enrich many services of infrastructure development.

DTL has been responsibly playing its role in establishing, upgrading, operating, and maintaining the EHV (Extra High Voltage) network. DTL has also been assigned the responsibility of running the State Load Dispatch Centre which is an apex body to ensure integrated operations of power systems in Delhi.

Transmission Network of DTL

Existing Transmission Network
The existing network of DTL consists of a 400 kV ring around the periphery of Delhi interlinked with the 220 kV network spread all over the city. A summary of the Transmission of DTL is given below.

List of Substations

Power Arrangements of Delhi

DTL had been arranging power from various sources for all the five distribution licensees since 1 July 2002. Keeping in mind the Commonwealth Games 2010 it had signed power purchase agreements for more than 9000 MW of power. This arrangement continued till 31 March 2007. From 1 April 2007 onwards all the distribution agencies are directly purchasing power and all the long and short term Power Purchase Agreements have been transferred to these agencies by Delhi Electricity Regulatory Commission (DERC) on the basis of their consumption. Now it is the responsibility of the distribution companies to arrange power for their respective areas. However a Power Procurement Group has been formed to coordinate the procurement and sale of power which is headed by a DTL Officer. Now DTL is responsible only for efficient transmission of power.

Power Generating Stations
There are total four Power Plants of Delhi Government Owned Inderprastha Power Generation Company Limited Details are as under .

There is one Central Sector Power Generation Plant owned by NTPC at Badarpur. 

Abbreviations
 
WHRU – Waste Heat Recovery Unit

GT – Gas Turbine

Power Supply Position of Delhi Over the Years
There has been considerable improvement in the power supply position at the end of five years of restructuring of power sector of Delhi. The peak demand is increasing every year while the load shedding has reduced tremendously.

Revenue Statistics

DTL has achieved a commendable financial turnaround after a four-year financial engineering process. It has posted profits in each of the past four years. DTL is one of the few entities of Government of NCT Delhi, which is earning profit and paying dividends to the Government.
It has been acreedited A*  rating company by the top rating agencies of the country i.e. CRISIL and Flich Rating India Ltd. This is the highest among all state transmission utilities in the country.

Key Statistics .

Transmission Load Forecast for 11th Plan
As per the projections made by Central Electricity Authority in its 17th EPS report and the recommendations for the transmission requirements for Delhi systems in the 11th Plan System Studies report of Central Electricity Authority for the
period 2007–2012.

Transmission Load Forecast for Delhi

As per Statistics published on DTL's website .

Anticipated Demand as per 17th Electric Power survey (MW)

The year wise anticipated demand of Delhi as per 17th Electric Power survey of CEA is indicated in the above-mentioned table from which it is evident that there is a 7 to 8% increase yearly in the demand of power in Delhi during 2008–12.

Care for Environment 
DTL operates its obligations in a clean, green pollution free environment and, has been providing more green coverage to the National Capital. It is spreading awareness among the masses to use eco-friendly electrical appliances. DTL is also introducing Energy Conservation Building Code in Delhi to maximize the use of natural resources and minimize the use, of electricity. Its proposed corporate office at 400 kV Sub Station Maharani Bagh will be a Green Building. The building is aimed to be a Platinum Rated Green Building. More than one lac sq meter land has been earmarked for plantation in the ensuing year.

Electricity Consumers Grievance Handling System 
Department of Power, Government of NCT of Delhi has established Public Grievance Cell http://www.biljipgr.gov.in to look into the complaints of electricity consumers. DTL has played a vital role in its establishment and is actively participating in its smooth and proper Functioning.

See also
 Delhi Vidyut Board

References

External links 
Power Companies in New Delhi, India
Delhi Transco Limited http://www.dtl.gov.in
IPGCL http://www.ipgcl-ppcl.gov.in
NDPL http://www.ndpl.com
BSES http://www.bsesdelhi.com
NTPC http://www.ntpc.co.in 

Companies based in New Delhi
Electric power transmission system operators in India
Energy in Delhi
State electricity agencies of India
State agencies of Delhi
2002 establishments in Delhi
Government agencies established in 2002